The 1999 Tashkent Open singles was the singles event of the first edition of the Tashkent Open; a WTA Tier IV tournament and the most prestigious women's tennis tournament held in Central Asia.

Anna Smashnova won in the final 6–3, 6–3 against Laurence Courtois, to win what was her first WTA Tour title.

Seeds

Draw

Finals

Top half

Bottom half

Qualifying

Seeds

Qualifiers

Qualifying draw

First qualifier

Second qualifier

Third qualifier

Fourth qualifier

References
 ITF singles results page

Singles
1999 WTA Tour